Gablitz is a municipality in the district of St. Pölten-Land in the Austrian state of Lower Austria.

It belonged to Wien-Umgebung which was dissolved in 2016.

Population

References

Cities and towns in St. Pölten-Land District
Cadastral community of St. Pölten District